Cheonggyesan is a mountain in South Korea. It extends over the district of Seocho-gu in Seoul, the national capital, and the cities of Gwacheon, Uiwang, and Seongnam in the province of Gyeonggi-do.

Cheonggyesan Mountain is located in the outskirts of Seoul and has Seoul Land, a theme park, Gwacheon Seoul Grand Park, Seoul Racing Park, and Gwacheon National Science Museum. The hiking trail is located in Seocho, Gangnam, and there are Cheonggye Valley, Ganarigol, Yangjae Freight Terminal, and Senjyeong-dong. In addition, there is a hiking trail from Mangyeo-dong in Gwacheon, and it is popular to walk from Cheonggyecheon, Uiwang-dong to Imsubong Mangyeongdae. On the south-west, Cheonggyesa Temple, which was built during the Silla Dynasty, is located at the eastern foot of Seoul Memorial Park and the Gyeongbu Expressway flows southeast.

Geography

Hiking Trails

Broadcasting Facilities

Transportation
 In Seoul
From Yangjae Station take bus number 4432
 In Uiwang in Gyeonggi Province
From Indeogwon Station Exit 2 take bus number 10 or 10-1 to the "Cheonggyesan Parking Lot" Stop 
 In Seongnam in Gyeonggi Province
From Moran Station Exit 3 take the Neighborhood bus number 11-1

See also
List of mountains in Seoul
List of mountains in Korea
Cheonggyesa Temple

Notes

References

Mountains of South Korea
Seocho District
Gwacheon
Uiwang
Seongnam
Mountains of Gyeonggi Province
Mountains of North Chungcheong Province